All Seasons Arena is a two-rink facility built in 1973 and located in Mankato, Minnesota, United States. It is the former home of the Minnesota State Mavericks women's ice hockey.

The arena is also used for practices by the Minnesota State Mavericks men's ice hockey team. It was used for men's intercollegiate games until 1995, when they moved to the newly opened Mankato Civic Center.

External links
All Seasons Arena

College ice hockey venues in the United States
Indoor arenas in Minnesota
Indoor ice hockey venues in Minnesota
Mankato, Minnesota
1973 establishments in Minnesota
Sports venues completed in 1973